Blastobasis repartella is a moth in the family Blastobasidae. It is found in the United States, including Colorado, Maine, South Dakota and Illinois.

Adults from mid-July to mid-August in eastern South Dakota.

The larvae bore in the proaxis and basal nodes and internodes of above ground stems of Panicum virgatum. Mature larvae are commonly found in late May. Pupae are mostly found during mid to late June within the plant stem. The resulting damage done to these plant stems has been colloquially referred to as, "dead heart," often leaving behind damaged or decaying plant matter.

References

Moths described in 1910
Blastobasis
Moths of North America